is a Japanese rower. He competed in the 1984, 1988, and 1992 Summer Olympics. He served as a coach for the Japanese rowing team at the 2012 Summer Olympics, and is currently a professor at Sendai University.

References

1963 births
Living people
Rowers at the 1984 Summer Olympics
Rowers at the 1988 Summer Olympics
Rowers at the 1992 Summer Olympics
Japanese male rowers
Olympic rowers of Japan
Asian Games medalists in rowing
Rowers at the 1986 Asian Games
Rowers at the 1990 Asian Games
Asian Games gold medalists for Japan
Asian Games silver medalists for Japan
Medalists at the 1986 Asian Games
Medalists at the 1990 Asian Games